Mingming Wu is  a professor at Cornell University within the Department of Biological and Environmental Engineering, and associate editor of Physical Biology.

Academic career
She earned a bachelor's of science degree from Nanjing University in 1984, and completed a doctorate from Ohio State University in 1992. Wu split her post doctoral research between École Polytechnique and the University of California, Santa Barbara, before beginning her teaching career at Occidental College. She joined the Cornell University faculty in 2003. Wu was named a fellow of the American Physical Society in 2016.

Research
Wu's current work focuses on discovering fundamental principles with which nature use to interact with the environment, in particular, how physical forces regulate cell migration. She is known for developing micro-scale tools controlling cellular environment, and use them to solve contemporary problems in health (tumor invasion and development) and environment (algal blooms).

Wu researched the interactions between cancer cells and the fibrous extracellular matrix surrounding them.
Wu also worked on a study investigating the diversity of cancer cells with statistical modeling methods.

References

External links 

 
 
 
  

Fellows of the American Physical Society
Nanjing University alumni
Ohio State University alumni
Cornell University faculty
Occidental College faculty